Fionoidea is a superfamily of small sea slugs, aeolid nudibranchs. They are gastropod mollusks within the infraorder Cladobranchia. The families within Fionoidea were shown to be monophyletic on DNA evidence and a re-interpretation of family characteristics was provided.

Families
Families within the superfamily Fionoidea are as follows:
 Family Abronicidae Korshunova, Martynov, Bakken, Evertsen, Fletcher, Mudianta, Saito, Lundin, Schrödl & Picton, 2017
 Family Apataidae Korshunova, Martynov, Bakken, Evertsen, Fletcher, Mudianta, Saito, Lundin, Schrödl & Picton, 2017
 Family Calmidae Iredale & O'Donoghue, 1923
 Family Cumanotidae Odhner, 1907
 Family Cuthonellidae Miller, 1971
 Family Cuthonidae Odhner, 1934
 Family Embletoniidae Pruvot-Fol, 1954
 Family Eubranchidae Odhner, 1934
 Family Fionidae Gray, 1857
 Family Flabellinidae Bergh, 1889
 Family Murmaniidae Korshunova, Martynov, Bakken, Evertsen, Fletcher, Mudianta, Saito, Lundin, Schrödl & Picton, 2017
 Family Paracoryphellidae M. C. Miller, 1971 
 Family Pinufiidae Er. Marcus & Ev. Marcus, 1960 
 Family Samlidae Korshunova, Martynov, Bakken, Evertsen, Fletcher, Mudianta, Saito, Lundin, Schrödl & Picton, 2017
 Family Tergipedidae Bergh, 1889
 Family Trinchesiidae F. Nordsieck, 1972
 Family Unidentiidae Millen & Hermosillo, 2012

References

 
Taxa named by John Edward Gray